Slivje is a village in the Municipality of Hrpelje-Kozina in the Littoral region of Slovenia close to the border with Croatia.

The parish church in the settlement is dedicated to Saint Martin and belongs to the diocese of Koper.

References

External links

Slivje on Geopedia

Populated places in the Municipality of Hrpelje-Kozina